Cat of Many Tails is a novel that was published in 1949 by Ellery Queen.  It is a mystery novel set in New York City, United States.

Plot summary
A strangler is killing Manhattanites, seemingly at random.  The only common thread is the unusual silk cords that are used for the killings; blue for men and pink for women.  Other than that, the victims come from all social classes and backgrounds, ethnicities, races, neighbourhoods, etc.  The city is in a panic.  Ellery Queen forms together a small group of people related to some of the victims, and some consultants, and works to determine the killer's reason for selecting these particular victims.  When he finally realizes the thread that connects the victims, the murderer is revealed and peace returns to the city.

Literary significance and criticism

After many popular mystery novels, a radio program and a number of movies, the character of Ellery Queen was at this point firmly established.  This novel is an early and unusual example of what has become known as a serial killer novel, but before the term "serial killer" was coined and before criminals such as the "Boston Strangler" came to the attention of the American public.  (The phrase "multiple murderer" is used in this novel as a synonym for "serial killer".)  Considerable time is spent describing the reaction of the city at large to the events of the novel, almost as if Manhattan itself were a character, and the novel employs narrative techniques unusual for Ellery Queen specifically and for mystery novels in general, such as extensive quoting of (imaginary) newspaper reports and an afterword that is "A Note on Names".

"A departure for EQ: more of a manhunt than a mystery, although with a neat twist. [And] there's that extraordinary sequence with Ellery and the psychiatrist."

A simplified version of this novel was made into a 1971 TV pilot film titled Ellery Queen: Don't Look Behind You.

Footnotes

External links 
"Ellery Queen is the American detective story."

1949 American novels
American novels adapted into films
Novels by Ellery Queen
Novels set in New York City
Little, Brown and Company books
American novels adapted into television shows